PVOD may refer to:

 Pulmonary venoocclusive disease
 Premium video on demand
 Pay-per-view video-on-demand